Line of succession to the Jordanian throne is the line of people who are eligible to succeed to the throne of the Hashemite Kingdom of Jordan. The succession is regulated by Article 28 of the Constitution of Jordan.

Succession rules 

The throne passes according to agnatic primogeniture, which can be bypassed by decree. The only people eligible to succeed are mentally sound Muslim men who are legitimate and agnatic descendants of Abdullah I of Jordan, born to Muslim parents.

The king has the right to appoint one of his brothers as heir apparent. If the king dies without son or appointed brother, the throne devolves upon the person whom the National Assembly selects from amongst the descendants of Hussein bin Ali, King of Hejaz, the founder of the Arab Revolt.

A person can be barred from succession by Royal Decree on the ground of unsuitability. His descendants would not be automatically excluded.

Line of succession

 King Hussein I of Hejaz (1854–1931)
 King Abdullah I (1882–1951)
 King Talal (1909–1972)
 King Hussein (1935–1999)
 King Abdullah II (born 1962)
(1) Crown Prince Hussein (b. 1994)
 (2) Prince Hashem (b. 2005)
(3) Prince Faisal (b. 1963)
(4) Prince Omar (b. 1993)
(5) Prince Abdullah (b. 2016)
(6) Prince Muhammad (b. 2017)
(7) Prince Ali (b. 1975)
 (8) Prince Abdullah (b. 2007)
(9) Hamzah (b. 1980)
(10) Prince Hussein (b. 2019)
(11) Prince Muhammad (b. 2022)
(12) Prince Hashim (b. 1981)
(13) Prince Hussein Haidara (b. 2015)
(14) Prince Mohammad Al Hassan (b. 2019)
Prince Muhammad (1940–2021)
(15) Prince Talal (b. 1965)
(16) Prince Hussein (b. 1999)
(17) Prince Muhammad (b. 2001)
 (18) Prince Ghazi (b. 1966)
(19) Prince Abdullah (b. 2001)
(20) Prince Hassan (b. 1947)
(21) Prince Rashid (b. 1979)
(22) Prince Hassan (b. 2013)
(23) Prince Talal (b. 2016)
Prince Nayef (1914–1983)
(24) Prince Ali (b. 1941)
(25) Prince Muhammad (b. 1973)
(26) Prince Hamzah (b. 2007)
(27) Prince Haidar (b. 2013)
(28) Prince Ja'far (b. 2007)
(29) Prince Asem (b. 1948)
(30) Prince Nayef (b. 1998)
(31) Prince Asem (b.2023)
 Prince Zeid (1898–1970) (32) Prince Ra'ad (born 1936)
(33) Prince Zeid II (b. 1964)
(34) Prince Ra'ad II (b. 2001)
(35) Prince Mired (b. 1965)
(36) Prince Rakan (b. 1995)
(37) Prince Jafar (b. 2002)
(38) Prince Firas (b. 1969)
(39) Prince Hashem (b. 2010)
(40) Prince Faisal (b. 1975)
(41) Prince Hussein (b. 2013)

List of heirs presumptive and heirs apparent throughout history
Heir apparent to Abdullah I
 1946–1951: Talal bin Abdullah, the eldest son of Abdullah I

Heir apparent to Talal
1951–1952: Hussein bin Talal, the eldest son of Talal

Heirs presumptive and heirs apparent to Hussein
1952–1962: Muhammad bin Talal, the eldest brother of Hussein (heir presumptive)
1962–1965: Abdullah bin Hussein, the eldest son of Hussein (heir apparent)
1965–1999: Hassan bin Talal, the second brother of Hussein (by decree)
1999: Abdullah bin Hussein, the eldest son of Hussein (by decree and Constitution)

King Hussein's brother, Prince Muhammad, was the heir presumptive to the throne until the birth of Hussein's eldest son, Abdullah. Abdullah was his father's heir apparent from his birth in 1962 until 1965, when King Hussein decided to appoint his 18-year-old brother Hassan as heir apparent because of the unstable times in the 1960s.

Shortly after his marriage to Queen Noor, King Hussein instructed his brother to appoint Prince Ali (Hussein's eldest son from his marriage to Queen Alia) as his heir apparent. However, by 1992, Hussein changed his mind. Besides his own sons, the King seriously regarded his nephew, Prince Talal bin Muhammad, as his possible heir. Finally, on 25 January 1999, shortly before his death, Hussein proclaimed Abdullah his heir apparent again and was succeeded by him on his death.

Heirs apparent to Abdullah II
1999–2004: Hamzah bin Hussein, the third brother of Abdullah II (by decree)
2004–present: Hussein bin Abdullah, the eldest son of Abdullah II (2004–09 by Constitution; 2009–present by decree and Constitution)

References
 The King and His Prerogatives: Article 2008

Robins, Philip: A History of Jordan'' Cambridge University Press 2004 

Jordan

Jordanian monarchy
Jordan-related lists